Penelope Whetton (5 January 1958 – 11 September 2019) was a climatologist and an expert in regional climate change projections due to global warming and in the impacts of those changes. Her primary scientific focus was Australia.

Early life
Whetton was born in Melbourne, Victoria, on 5 January 1958. She held a Bachelor of Science (Honours), majoring in physics, and an honours year in meteorology, from the University of Melbourne. She received a Doctor of Philosophy degree from the same university in 1986.

Career
Whetton started her career in the late 1980s as a researcher in the Department of Geography at Monash University in Clayton, Victoria.

In 1989, she joined the Atmospheric Research division of CSIRO (later becoming CMAR CSIRO Marine and Atmospheric Research). Whetton became a research leader in 1999 and a research program leader in 2009. Whetton was a Lead Author on the Third, Fourth, and Fifth Assessment Reports of the UN Intergovernmental Panel on Climate Change (IPCC). The Fourth Assessment Report of which was awarded the Nobel Peace Prize in 2007.

Whetton was an invited speaker at various climate change conferences such as the Aspen Global Change Institute, Four Degrees Or More? Australia in a Hot World at the University of Melbourne in 2011, and the Greenhouse 2011: The Science of Climate Change conference.

Whetton published numerous scientific journal articles on climate change as well as a contribution to more popular publications.

Personal life
Whetton lived in Footscray, Victoria, with her wife Janet Rice, a Greens Senator and former Mayor of Maribyrnong, and their two sons. In 2003, Whetton underwent gender affirmation surgery.

Whetton died on 11 September 2019 in Sisters Beach, Tasmania.

References

External links
 

Australian climatologists
Women climatologists
Intergovernmental Panel on Climate Change lead authors
Transgender women
1958 births
2019 deaths
University of Melbourne alumni
Transgender scientists
Australian LGBT scientists
Transgender academics
Scientists from Melbourne
Academic staff of Monash University